= Igbomina FM =

- Ilorin; Nigeria
- Broadcast area: Kwara State
- Frequency: 90.9 MHz

Programming
- Languages: Yoruba, Yoruba

History
- First air date: 2018

Igbomina FM is a Nigerian private community radio broadcaster located in Oke Iroko, Pamo, Isin, Kwara State. It was launched in December 2018. It is aired on 90.9 FM frequency. Igbomina FM has limited operating hours: 8 am to 7 pm on weekdays, also broadcasting at weekends.
